William Gillespie (14 May 1887 – 11 September 1927) was an Australian rules footballer who played with Melbourne in the Victorian Football League (VFL).

Notes

External links 

 

1887 births
1927 deaths
Australian rules footballers from Melbourne
Melbourne Football Club players
Footscray Football Club (VFA) players